Hypnum jutlandicum is a species of moss belonging to the family Hypnaceae. It is widely distributed in Europe and the Aleutian islands but it is also found in other parts of the world.

In a study of the effect of the herbicide Asulam on moss growth, Hypnum jutlandicum was shown to have intermediate sensitivity to Asulam exposure.

References

Hypnaceae
Plants described in 1969